Covesea Skerries Lighthouse, originally belonging to the Northern Lighthouse Board (NLB), is built on top of a small headland on the south coast of the Moray Firth at Covesea, near Lossiemouth, Moray, Scotland.

History
Following a storm in the Moray Firth in November 1826 when 16 vessels were sunk, applications were made for lighthouses at Tarbat Ness, on the opposite coast, and at Covesea Skerries. The Commissioners of Northern Light Houses (the precursor of the NLB) and Trinity House felt that a lighthouse at Covesea was unnecessary but this was against public opinion.  Many letters and petitions were delivered to them.  Eventually, the engineer and a committee of the Board surveyed the coastline and the Elder Brethren were asked to look for the best location. They recommended a lighthouse on the Craighead with a beacon on Halliman's Skerries, which the Commissioners agreed to. A grid iron tower was erected on the Halliman's Skerries in 1845, and in 1846, the Covesea Skerries Lighthouse was completed at a cost of £11,514 (equivalent to £ as of ).

The surrounding walls, because of their height, caused vortices in the yard area in strong winds.  This interfered with lightkeepers lookout so the walls were lowered in 1907.

In 1984, the lighthouse was automated being remotely monitored and controlled at the Northern Lighthouse Board's offices in Edinburgh, but originally, the lens was rotated by a clockwork mechanism with gradually descending weights providing the energy. The original lens is on display at the Lossiemouth Fisheries and Community Museum. 

The light was extinguished on 2 March 2012 in effect replaced "by a North Cardinal navigational lit buoy fitted with X Band Radar Beacon at the north eastern extremity of the Halliman Skerries on 21 February 2012."

Engineer
The lighthouse was designed and built by Alan Stevenson, a member of the Stevenson lighthouse engineering dynasty and uncle of the novelist Robert Louis Stevenson.

Covesea Lighthouse Community Company Limited
Following the discontinuation of the light on 2 March 2012 the Board no longer required the site at Covesea and plans were put in place to sell the Category A Listed property. In July 2012 the Northern Lighthouse Board received notification from The Scottish Government that the Covesea Lighthouse Community Company Limited had registered an interest in the Covesea Skerries property under the terms contained in Part 2 of the Land Reform (Scotland) Act 2003.  The Covesea Lighthouse Community Company was formed by the local business association in Lossiemouth to develop the lighthouse site for tourism.

The Covesea Lighthouse Community Company managed to secure a major grant from the Scottish Land Fund and on 4 April 2013 the Northern Lighthouse Board sold the entire lighthouse complex at Covesea Skerries to the Covesea Lighthouse Community Company.  The plan is now to develop the iconic landmark as a major tourism hub to promote local heritage, the area's unique wildlife and environment and its links to the nearby airbase at RAF Lossiemouth.

See also

 List of lighthouses in Scotland
 List of Northern Lighthouse Board lighthouses
 List of Category A listed buildings in Moray

References

External links

 Official Website
 Northern Lighthouse Board

Lighthouses completed in 1846
Lighthouses in Scotland
Category A listed buildings in Moray
Category A listed lighthouses
Lossiemouth